Khalifehi may refer to:
 Khalifehi, Bushehr
 Khalifehi, Kohgiluyeh and Boyer-Ahmad

See also
 Khalifeh (disambiguation)